Crash the Party is the only studio album by American hip hop duo Smilez & Southstar. It was released on July 23, 2002 via Artistdirect. Production was handled primarily by Dakari, with one track produced by DJ Nasty & LVM. The album peaked at number 91 on the Billboard 200 and at number 24 on the Top R&B/Hip-Hop Albums.

Track listing

Sample credits
Track #4 contains elements from "Can't Find The Judge" by Gary Wright
Track #10 contains elements from "Stop, Look, Listen (To Your Heart)" by Marvin Gaye and Diana Ross
Track #12 contains elements from "Golden Country" by REO Speedwagon

Charts

Weekly charts

Year-end charts

References

External links

2002 debut albums
Smilez & Southstar albums